
Gmina Radzyń Chełmiński is an urban-rural gmina (administrative district) in Grudziądz County, Kuyavian-Pomeranian Voivodeship, in north-central Poland.

Villages
Apart from the town of Radzyń Chełmiński, Gmina Radzyń Chełmiński contains the villages and settlements of Czeczewo, Dębieniec, Gawłowice, Gołębiewo, Gziki, Kneblowo, Mazanki, Nowy Dwór, Radzyń-Wieś, Radzyń-Wybudowanie, Rozental, Rywałd, Stara Ruda, Szumiłowo, Wymysłowo, Zakrzewo and Zielnowo.

Neighbouring gminas
Gmina Radzyń Chełmiński is bordered by the gminas of Grudziądz, Gruta, Książki, Płużnica, Świecie nad Osą and Wąbrzeźno.

References
Polish official population figures 2006

Radzyn Chelminski
Grudziądz County